Yapen Islands Regency is a regency (kabupaten) in Papua Province of eastern Indonesia. The official estimate as at mid 2021 was 114,210. It comprises an archipelago which lies in Cenderawasih Bay off the north coast of Western New Guinea.

Geography
The regency includes the islands and island groups of the Yapen Islands archipelago, including the main Yapen island. Its capital is Serui (part of Yapen Selatan district). The area is seismically active. A magnitude 7.5 earthquake in 1979 caused serious destruction and a tsunami, killing 115 people.

Administrative Districts
The Yapen Islands Regency in 2010 comprised twelve districts (distrik);  however, by 2018 four additional districts has been created (Anotaurei, Pulau Kurudu, Pulau Yerui and Yawakukat), bringing the total to sixteen, which are subdivided into 165 administrative "villages". The districts are tabulated below with their areas and their populations at the 2010 Census and 2020 Census, together with official estimates as at mid 2021. Kurudu Island (Pulau Kurudu) lies to the east of Yapen, and Num Island (Pulau Yerui) lies to the west of Yapen, while the Ambai Islands (Kepulauan Ambai) lie immediately off the south coast of Yapen. The table also includes the name of the administrative centre of each district, the number of administrative villages in each district (160 rural desa and 5 urban kelurahan in total) and its post code.

Notes: Kepulauan Ambai District consists of 17 islands; Yapen Barat District includes 20 offshore islands, while Angkaisera District includes three offshore islands and Wonawa District includes five offshore islands.(a) the 2010 figure for Pulau Kurudu District is included in that for Yapen Timur District, from which it was split.(b) the 2010 figure for Pulau Yerui District is included in that for Yapen Barat District, from which it was split.(c) the 2010 figure for Aotaurei District is included in that for Yapen Selatan District, from which it was split.(d) the 2010 figure for Yawakukat District is included in that for Angkaisera District, from which it was split.

Climate
Serui has a tropical rainforest climate (Af) with heavy rainfall year-round.

See also

References

External links
Statistics publications from Statistics Indonesia (BPS)

 
Regencies of Papua (province)
Cenderawasih Bay